Starrcade '88: True Gritt was the sixth annual Starrcade professional wrestling pay-per-view (PPV) event produced under the National Wrestling Alliance (NWA) banner. It was the first Starrcade event produced by World Championship Wrestling (WCW), and it took place on December 26, 1988, from the Norfolk Scope in Norfolk, Virginia. Shortly before the event, Ted Turner bought Jim Crockett Promotions (JCP), and the company became WCW.

The main event was an over 30 minute bout between Ric Flair and Lex Luger for the NWA World Heavyweight Championship. They were once members of the Four Horsemen stable, but Luger began to have issues with the other members, and left the group. Luger started a feud with Flair when Barry Windham, a friend of Luger's, turned on him, and joined the Four Horsemen. Other matches included The Road Warriors against Sting and Dusty Rhodes for the NWA World Tag Team Championship, Barry Windham against Bam Bam Bigelow for the NWA United States Heavyweight Championship, and Mike Rotunda against Rick Steiner for the NWA World Television Championship. the main event was a 17-Man $50,000 Bunkhouse Battle Royal won by the Junkyard Dog

Storylines
The event featured wrestlers from pre-existing scripted feuds and storylines. Wrestlers portrayed villains, heroes, or less distinguishable characters in the scripted events that built tension and culminated in a wrestling match or series of matches.

The main feud heading into Starrcade was between Ric Flair and Lex Luger over the NWA World Heavyweight Championship. In March 1987, Luger joined the Four Horsemen stable, which was headed by Flair. Luger remained a member until early 1988, when Luger felt he was held back by the Four Horsemen. Luger left the Four Horsemen, and became friends with Barry Windham in March. Windham soon turned on Luger, however, and joined the Four Horsemen. Since then, Luger feuded with Flair, and they faced each other in several title matches, including at The Great American Bash, where the match was stopped due to Luger's excessive bleeding. Flair remained the champion, and a rematch was made at Starrcade.

In late 1988, Jim Crockett Promotions, which originally produced Starrcade, failed to compete with the World Wrestling Federation, and was on the verge of bankruptcy. Ted Turner bought the company in November, and it became World Championship Wrestling. Previous Starrcade events were held on Thanksgiving, but this event was moved to December to avoid direct competition with the WWF's Survivor Series event. The Starrcade events after were also held in December. This event was the last to be held in a traditional format until 1993. The following four Starrcade events featured tournaments and the Battlebowl battle royal.

Event

The first match was between the team of The Varsity Club (Kevin Sullivan and Steve Williams) and The Fantastics (Bobby Fulton and Tommy Rogers) for the NWA United States Tag Team Championship. The match began with The Fantastics having the advantage. Sullivan and Williams fought back after Sullivan blocked a splash from Rogers with his knees. They dominated Rogers until Fulton tagged in, and attacked both. After performing mounted punches to Williams, Fulton applied the sleeper hold. As Fulton ran at Williams, Williams dropped him on the top rope, and pinned him to win the match and the title.

The second match was between The Original Midnight Express (Dennis Condrey and Randy Rose) (accompanied by Paul E. Dangerously) and The Midnight Express (Bobby Eaton and Stan Lane) (accompanied by Jim Cornette). The match started with Eaton and Lane dominating Condrey and Rose, and Cornette interfering using his tennis racket. This continued until Eaton missed a corner attack on Rose. Condrey and Rose attacked Eaton, and attempted a Rocket Launcher. Eaton avoided it, and Lane tagged in. Lane attacked them both, and pinned Rose after a Double Goozle to win the match. After the match, Condrey, Rose and Dangerously attacked Eaton, Lane and Cornette until Eaton fought them off with the racket.

The third match was between The Russian Assassins (#1 and #2) (with Paul Jones) and the team of Ivan Koloff and The Junkyard Dog (replacing Nikita Koloff). The Junkyard Dog and Koloff had the early advantage with attacks to both. After a double clothesline to #1, The Junkyard Dog missed a falling headbutt. The Russian Assassins fought back with attacks until #2 missed a Russian Missile to The Junkyard Dog. The Junkyard Dog and Koloff had the advantage until #1 placed a foreign object in his mask. #1 performed a headbutt to Koloff, and pinned him to win the match.

The fourth match was between Rick Steiner and Mike Rotunda for the NWA World Television Championship. Kevin Sullivan, who accompanied Rotunda, was locked inside a cage. Rotunda had the advantage after Steiner hit the floor outside the ring, and Rotunda applied the chinlock. Steiner avoided a dropkick, and fought back with mounted punches. After Steiner performed a belly to belly suplex, Steve Williams rang the bell, confusing Steiner and the referee. Sullivan was released from the cage, and climbed on the apron. Steiner sent Rotunda into Sullivan, and pinned Rotunda to win the match and the title.

The fifth match was between Barry Windham and Bam Bam Bigelow for the NWA United States Heavyweight Championship. Bigelow had the advantage, and performed a slingshot splash. Bigelow then missed a splash, and Windham fought back. Windham applied the clawhold, and attempted a diving elbow drop. Bigelow avoided it, and fought back until Windham sent them both outside the ring with a crossbody block. Windham avoided an attack, and Bigelow ran into the ringpost. Windham returned to the ring, and Bigelow was counted out. Windham won the match, and retained the title.

The sixth match was between The Road Warriors (Hawk and Animal) (accompanied by Paul Ellering) and the team of Sting and Dusty Rhodes for the NWA World Tag Team Championship. The match went back and forth until Hawk repeatedly raked the eyes of Rhodes. Animal applied the neck vice on Rhodes, and Hawk applied the sleeper hold. Rhodes performed a jawbreaker, and Sting and Animal tagged in. Sting performed a Stinger splash, and attempted to apply the Scorpion Deathlock. Hawk attacked Sting, and attempted to double-team Rhodes with Animal. Rhodes fought out, and Sting performed a diving crossbody to Animal. As Sting attempted to pin Animal, Ellering interfered, and the Road Warriors were disqualified. Rhodes and Sting won the match, and the Road Warriors retained the title.

The main event was between Lex Luger and Ric Flair for the NWA World Heavyweight Championship. Luger gained the early advantage, and targeted the left arm of Flair. Luger applied the hammerlock, and used the guard rail and ringpost. Flair fought back after he avoided an elbow drop, and sent Luger's head into the guard rail. Luger applied the sleeper hold, but Flair fought out with a belly to back suplex. Luger fought back with a superplex, and applied the figure four leglock. Luger continued to have the advantage until Flair pulled Luger down, and hit his left knee with a steel chair. Flair then targeted Luger's left leg, and applied the figure four leglock. Luger fought back with a gorilla press slam. After performing mounted punches and a scoop powerslam, Luger applied the Torture Rack. However, his knees buckled, and Flair fell on top of him. Flair then pinned Luger with his feet on the rope to win the match, and retain the title.

Aftermath
After Starrcade, the feud between Ric Flair and Lex Luger ended. The Four Horsemen faction would officially disband after James J. Dillon left WCW for a front office job in the WWF, and the Horsemen became part of a faction ran by Hiro Matsuda called the "Yamasaki Corporation" (storyline was that Dillon had "sold" the contracts of Flair and Barry Windham, the two remaining Horsemen, to Matsuda).  Flair and Windham began a feud with "Hot Stuff" Eddie Gilbert which culminated in Gilbert bringing in a mystery partner, Mr. X, to wrestle in a tag team match on World Championship Wrestling, and after Mr. X was revealed to be Ricky Steamboat, Steamboat pinned Flair on TBS, which rekindled their feud that ended back in 1984 over the NWA World Heavyweight Championship. They were presented to have opposite characters, and live opposite lifestyles, with Flair being flamboyant, and Steamboat being a family man. Steamboat won the title at Chi-Town Rumble, and they continued to wrestle in many rematches. Their feud ended when Flair regained the title at WrestleWar in a match considered by many as the greatest match of all time. Luger fought Barry Windham at Chi-Town Rumble, and won the NWA United States Heavyweight Championship.  Windham left WCW and returned to the WWF as "The Widowmaker".  

After Starrcade, Dusty Rhodes was fired from WCW for blading on an episode of World Championship Wrestling against Ted Turner's strict no-blading rule on television, joined Steve Keirn and Mike Graham to revive the old Florida territory (called Professional Wrestling Federation) before joining the WWF as the polka-dotted "common man" in mid-1989.  Announcer Tony Schiavone would leave WCW in February 1989 and move to the WWF, where he would resume his announcing career on the Wrestling Challenge program as well as calling some PPVs before he returned to WCW in 1990.  Paul Jones would leave WCW after Starrcade and retire in 1991.

Results

References

External links
Starrcade 1988 Review at 411mania
Starrcade 1988 Review at The Powerdriver Review

Events in Virginia
Events in Norfolk, Virginia
Starrcade
1988 in Virginia
Professional wrestling in Norfolk, Virginia
December 1988 events in the United States
1988 World Championship Wrestling pay-per-view events